Dar Oulad Zidouh is a town and rural commune in Fquih Ben Salah Province, Béni Mellal-Khénifra, Morocco. According to the 2004 census the town had a population of 9,821.

References

Populated places in Fquih Ben Salah Province
Rural communes of Béni Mellal-Khénifra